María Alejandra Idrobo Paz (born 8 April 1988 in El Tambo, Cauca) is a Colombian athlete who specialises in the sprinting events. She has won multiple medals on the regional level.

Personal bests
100 metres – 11.43 (+0.4 m/s) (Bogotá, 13 August 2011)
200 metres – 23.20 (+0.9 m/s) (Barquisimeto, 9 June 2012)
400 metres – 52.80 A (Bogotá, 24 May 2009)

Competition record

References

1988 births
Living people
Colombian female sprinters
Athletes (track and field) at the 2007 Pan American Games
Sportspeople from Cauca Department
South American Games gold medalists for Colombia
South American Games silver medalists for Colombia
South American Games bronze medalists for Colombia
South American Games medalists in athletics
Competitors at the 2006 South American Games
Competitors at the 2010 South American Games
Competitors at the 2014 South American Games
Central American and Caribbean Games gold medalists for Colombia
Central American and Caribbean Games silver medalists for Colombia
Competitors at the 2006 Central American and Caribbean Games
Competitors at the 2010 Central American and Caribbean Games
Competitors at the 2014 Central American and Caribbean Games
Central American and Caribbean Games medalists in athletics
Pan American Games competitors for Colombia
21st-century Colombian women